Bosara epilopha is a moth in the family Geometridae. It is found in Queensland.

References

Moths described in 1907
Eupitheciini
Moths of Queensland